The Crown of Winter is the second full-length album by the Russian symphonic black / doom / Gothic metal band Forest Stream. Originally scheduled for release on March 23, 2009 through Candlelight Records, it was delayed until August 11.

Track listing 

 "Intro (Feral Magic)" - 2:19
 "The Crown of Winter" - 11:44
 "Mired" - 9:27
 "Bless You to Die" - 7:39
 "Autumn Dancers" - 8:40
 "The Seventh Symphony of..." - 9:05
 "The Beautiful Nature" - 9:25
 "Outro (the Awakening Dreamland)" - 1:41

References 

2009 albums
Forest Stream albums